The Ocean State Cup is awarded to each season's winner of the quadrangular all sports series among the four Rhode Island Division I schools, the Brown Bears, Bryant Bulldogs, Providence Friars, and Rhode Island Rams. In the event of a tie, the award is shared, but the previous winner retains possession of the trophy.

History of the Cup
The Ocean State Cup was created in 2009 when Bryant declared its move to Division I. The Ocean State Cup started off as just a lacrosse cup and was between Brown, Bryant and Providence. In 2011, the cup was moved to an all-sports cup and now included Rhode Island.

Winners of the trophy
Brown victories are shown in ██ brown, Bryant victories in ██ Gold, Providence victories in ██ black, and Rhode Island victories in ██ Keaney Blue.
Future events are shown in ██ silver. In the event of a shared award, the previous year's winner retains custody of the trophy.  Below are the winners of the Ocean State Cup for Men's Lacrosse.

See also 

 Ocean State Rivalry (Providence v.s. Rhode Island)

References

College football rivalry trophies in the United States
Rhode Island Rams
Brown Bears
Bryant Bulldogs
Providence Friars